Jodel Lesage (born 1954) is a Haitian military officer, who served as the Acting Commander-in-Chief of the Armed Forces of Haiti from 17 November 2017 to 27 March 2018. He is the first Commander-in-Chief following the re-establishment of the Armed Forces after 22 years and their disbandment in 1995, during the Operation Uphold Democracy.

References

1954 births
Living people
Haitian military personnel
Haitian generals